Berbey Sign Language is a family sign language of the village of Berbey in the Hombori region of Mali. The local oral language is Humburi Senni. The language is currently spoken by two brothers (one of whom is deaf) and their families, including four deaf children. In the brothers' father's generation, all signers were deaf.

See also
Douentza Sign Language

References

Village sign languages
Sign languages of Mali